Pedro Girón Acuña Pacheco (1423–1466), was Master of the Order of Calatrava (1445–1466), 1st Lord of Ureña and Osuna, and an important political figure at the court of Henry IV of Castile.

He was the younger brother of Juan Pacheco and nephew of Alfonso Carrillo de Acuña, Archbishop of Toledo.
In the trail of his brother, and a confidant of the young prince and later King Henry IV of Castile, he became one of the most powerful and rich persons in the Castilian court.

At the age of 22 he became Master of the military Order of Calatrava, and received in 1448 the strategic town of Peñafiel, where he built the Peñafiel Castle. When Prince Henry became King in 1454, Pedro received several towns and titles including Lord of Osuna, which would become the powerful House of Osuna.

Together with his brother and uncle, he was the de facto ruler of Castile, until 1461 when Beltrán de la Cueva became the new confidant of King Henry IV. As a reaction the brothers and their allies proclaimed the King's half-brother Prince Alfonso as new King, in an event known as the Farce of Ávila.

King Henry IV then offered the hand of his half-sister Isabella in marriage to Pedro. But when Pedro travelled to Madrid at the head of a 3,000-strong force to negotiate the marriage, he suddenly fell ill and died.

Children 
As Master of the Order of Calatrava, Pedro was not allowed to marry. Despite this, he had four children with Inés de las Casas, which he legitimized in 1459 by Pope Pius II, with the support of King Henry IV.
 Alfonso (c. 1454 – 1469), 1st Count of Ureña, died at the age of 16.
 Rodrigo, (1456–1482), succeeded his father as Master of the Order of Calatrava. Died in battle during the War of the Castilian Succession.
 Juan (c. 1456 – 1528), 2nd Count of Ureña. Had issue.
 María

1423 births
1466 deaths
Pedro
Pedro
Grand Masters of the Order of Calatrava